Club Deportivo Aurrerá de Vitoria is a Spanish sports club based in Vitoria-Gasteiz, Álava, in the autonomous community of the Basque Country. Founded in 1935 it currently plays in Tercera División – Group 4, holding home matches at Estadio Olaranbe, with a 4,000-seat capacity.

It is a partner club of the local professional team Deportivo Alavés. Aurrera's women's team competes in Segunda División.

In addition to the football team, the club has sections of roller hockey, futsal, athletics, archery and inline speed skating.

Season to season

8 seasons in Segunda División B
12 seasons in Tercera División

Honours
Segunda División B:  1996–97
Tercera División: 1994–95
RFEF Basque tournament: 1994–95, 2002–03

Notable former players
 Álvaro
 Aritz Aduriz

References

External links
Official website 
Futbolme team profile 
Aurrera Vitoria Femenino at Txapeldunak

Football clubs in the Basque Country (autonomous community)
Sport in Vitoria-Gasteiz
Multi-sport clubs in Spain
Futsal clubs in Spain
Spanish rink hockey clubs
Association football clubs established in 1935
1935 establishments in Spain